Phonocatheter is the debut studio album of Shattering Sirens, released on December 3, 1996 by Fused Coil. The album was distributed as a promo before Fifth Colvmn Records, the distributor for Fused Coil, went bankrupt and closed its doors.

Reception 

AllMusic awarded Phonocatheter three out of five possible stars. Option described the music as "dark, dissonant, disturbing atmospherics in the vein of Bill Laswell's Sub Meta material."

Track listing

Personnel
Adapted from the liner notes of Phonocatheter.

Shattering Sirens
 Tim Bradlee – instruments, cover art, photography

Release history

References

External links 
 Phonocatheter at Discogs (list of releases)

1996 debut albums
Fifth Colvmn Records albums